A mobile phone jammer or blocker is a device which deliberately transmits signals on the same radio frequencies as mobile phones, disrupting the communication between the phone and the cell-phone base station, effectively disabling mobile phones within the range of the jammer, preventing them from receiving signals and from transmitting them. Jammers can be used in practically any location, but are found primarily in places where a phone call would be particularly disruptive because silence is expected, such as entertainment venues.

Because they disrupt the operations of legitimate mobile phone services, the use of such blocking devices is illegal in many jurisdictions, especially without a licence. When operational, such devices also block access to emergency services.

Legality
Since these jammers actively broadcast radio signals, they may or may not be legal to possess or operate based on the specific laws of the area one is in.

 Australia: Illegal to operate, supply, or possess unless the user has a PMTS C telecommunications licence under the Radiocommunications (Interpretation) Determination 2000.

 Brazil: Illegal, but installation in jails has been proposed.

 Canada: Illegal under sections 4, 9, and 10 of the Radiocommunication Act, except by federal law-enforcement agencies who have obtained approval.

 EU: Illegal, according to the European Commission's "Interpretation of the Directive 1999/5/EC".

 France: Legal until 2012 in movie theaters, concert halls and places with performances, but illegal since 2012.

 India: Illegal by law except for security and military agencies, and usage in jail, theatres, mosques, schools etc. with prior permit and jamming strictly limited to the firm perimeter with zero leakage.

Iran: Illegal to use without permits.

Israel: Illegal.

Italy: Illegal both to own and use, according to the Penal Code offenders are punished with imprisonment up to eight years. Can be used under strict authorization in exceptional cases by Italian law enforcement agencies, such as Polizia Di Stato and Carabinieri.
Malaysia: Illegal to use. Offenders jamming the cellular network frequency in their premises can be fined a maximum of RM500,000 or jailed a maximum of five years, or both.

New Zealand: Illegal to sell, manufacture, or use. Legal inside jails by Department of Corrections.

 Pakistan: Illegal to use without permission. The individuals or institutions must get No Objection Certificates (NOCs) before installation of such devices.

 Singapore: Illegal to manufacture, import, use or sell radio jamming equipment other than by or for supply to a permitted person.

 South Africa: Illegal. No organisation is allowed to jam cellular signals, and any device which is used to jam signals is illegal.

 Sweden: Illegal. Legal inside jails, prisons, and for military use.

 Ukraine: Legal, planned to be used in schools.

United Kingdom: Illegal to use, but legal to own. Having been proposed by prison inspectors, installation and use in jails has been legal since the end of 2012.

United States: Cell phone blocking devices are used by federal officials under certain circumstances. Privacy rights of property owners may affect the policy and application of law within buildings. For radio communications, it is illegal to operate, manufacture, import, or offer for sale (including advertising) (Communications Act of 1934). Blocking radio communications in public can carry fines of up to $112,000 and/or imprisonment of up to one year. The Homeland Security Act of 2002 may override the Communications Act of 1934.

See also
IMSI-catcher
Radio jamming
Microphone blocker

References

Mobile telecommunications